Anhua County is a county in the Province of Hunan, China, it is under the administration of Yiyang Prefecture-level City.

Located in the north-central part of the province, the county is bordered to the north by Dingcheng District of Changde City and Taoyuan County, to the east by Taojiang and Ningxiang Counties, to the south by Lianyuan City and Xinhua County, to the west by Xupu and Yuanling Counties. Anhua has 18 towns and 5 townships under its jurisdiction, the county seat is Dongping.

Anhua County is the source place of Anhua dark tea, which is a kind of dark tea; Anhua was an important nodal point of the Tea Horse Road in ancient times. Anhua is both the southernmost and westernmost county-level division of Yiyang. Anhua and its neighborhood have a very distinct indigenous culture - Meishan culture, which has quite long history and profound religious content, influenced by mainstream Han-Chinese culture and also some neighbor cultures during its developing process.

Administrative divisions
According to the result on adjustment of township-level divisions of Anhua County on February 17, 2006, Anhua County has 18 towns and 5 townships under its jurisdiction. they are:

18 towns
 Changtang, Anhua
 Dafu, Anhua: Merging Dongshan Township, Building town experimental zone of Xinqiao and the former Dafu Town on February 17, 2006.
 Dongping, Anhua: Merging Muzi Township, Yanglin Township and the former Dongping Town on February 17, 2006.
 Jiangnan, Anhua: Merging Dongshi Township and the former Jiangnan Town on February 17, 2006.
 Kuixi, Anhua
 Le'an, Anhua
 Lengshi, Anhua
 Malu, Anhua: Merging Cangchang Township and the former Malu Town on February 17, 2006.
 Meicheng, Anhua: Merging Lilin Township and the former Meicheng Town on February 17, 2006.
 Pingkou, Anhua
 Qingtangpu, Anhua
 Qujiang, Anhua
 Taoxi, Anhua
 Xianxi, Anhua
 Xiaoyan, Anhua
 Yangjiaotang
 Yanxi, Anhua
 Zhexi, Anhua

5 townships
 Gaoming, Anhua
 Gulou, Anhua
 Longtang, Anhua
 Nanjin, Anhua
 Tianzhuang, Anhua

Climate

References

www.xzqh.org

External links

 
County-level divisions of Hunan
Geography of Yiyang